Soderstorf is a municipality in the district of Lüneburg, in Lower Saxony, Germany. Soderstorf has an area of 35.86 km² and a population of 1,488 (as of December 31, 2007). A prehistoric cemetery called the Necropolis of Soderstorf is located near the town.

References